East Cairn Hill  is a hill in the Pentland Hills range of Scotland.

The borders of three council areas, Scottish Borders, West Lothian and Edinburgh meet at the top. The East Cairn Hill marks both the southernmost extension of the Edinburgh region and the easternmost point of West Lothian. The closest settlement is the hamlet of Carlops around six kilometers to the southeast. West Calder is nine kilometers to the northwest and Penicuik is eleven kilometers to the east. The Cauldstane Slap pass runs at the saddle point between West and East Cairn Hill. The surrounding hills include Wether Law in the southeast and West Cairn Hill in the southwest

Surroundings
The Cauldstane Slap, a formerly important pass route, runs between East and West Cairn Hill.

There is a cairn near the eastern crest of the East Cairn Hills. This measures  at a height of two meters. The cairn was disturbed by a build-up. When it was opened again in the early 20th century, bone fragments and flint ax tips were found.

In front of the western flank is the Harperrig Reservoir. Established in 1860, the reservoir dams the water of the Water of Leith and serves both to supply Edinburgh with water and to regulate the flow of the Water of Leith.

References

Marilyns of Scotland
Mountains and hills of the Scottish Borders
Mountains and hills of West Lothian
Hills of Edinburgh